Mustafa Said Qadir (born 6 July 1958 in Qaladize, Sulaymaniyah Governorate) has been Vice President of Kurdistan Region under Nechirvan Idris Barzani's administration since 8 September 2019.

Mustafa earned a degree from Technical Institute of Agriculture in Baghdad in 1979. He was a political prisoner under the Ba'athist Iraq. He used to hold senior positions within Patriotic Union of Kurdistan, including membership in PUK politburo. Currently he is one of the leaders of the Gorran Movement.

Mustafa became a member of the newly established Kurdistan National Assembly in its first the parliamentary election of 1992, and he was appointed as minister of interior in PUK's Sulaymaniyah administration in 1998. He was also minister of Peshmerga.

In 2019 Mustafa was selected as Gorran candidate for Vice President of Kurdistan Region.

References

External links
 Mustafa Qadir Mustafa's profile on the official Kurdistan Regional Government website

Iraqi Kurdish people
1958 births
Vice Presidents of Kurdistan Region
Gorran Movement politicians
Patriotic Union of Kurdistan politicians
Kurdish politicians
People from Sulaymaniyah Province
Living people